Tanjiang Subdistrict is a subdistrict in Daxiang District, Shaoyang, Hunan, China. , it has three residential communities and three villages under its administration.

See also 
 List of township-level divisions of Hunan

References 

Subdistricts of Hunan
Daxiang District